Erythrina polychaeta is a species of legume in the family Fabaceae.
It is found only in Ecuador. Its natural habitat is subtropical or tropical moist montane forests.

References

Sources

polychaeta
Flora of Ecuador
Vulnerable plants
Taxonomy articles created by Polbot